Wesley Koolhof and Matwé Middelkoop were the defending champions but chose not to defend their title.

Íñigo Cervantes and Oriol Roca Batalla won the title after Ariel Behar and Enrique López-Pérez retired while trailing 2–6, 5–6.

Seeds

Draw

References
 Main Draw

Copa Sevilla doubles
Copa Sevilla - Doubles